The Huifa River is a 267.7-km-long tributary of the Second Songhua River in center Northeast China. The source of river is located in Qingyuan Manchu Autonomous County of Liaoning Province and flows generally from west to east across Meihekou、Huinan、Huadian of Jilin Province and joins Second Songhua River at Toudaogou of Huadian City.

History
Large numbers of dolmens are distributed along the Huifa River's upper reaches. They date to the fifth century BCE and are related to similar megalithic tombs located on the Korean Peninsula and in the Liao River basin and

Notes

Rivers of Jilin
Songhua River